The  is a mid-size station wagon manufactured by the Japanese automaker Toyota. It is the replacement of the Mark II Qualis and shared a platform with the X110 series Mark II rear-wheel drive sedan, while the Mark II Qualis is a rebadged XV20 series Camry Gracia wagon, with front-wheel drive layout. The Mark II Blit was introduced in January 2002 and ended production in June 2007 due to consolidation efforts. The car remained in production until three years after the Mark X came out, which replaced all of Toyota's X-body sedans, the Verossa, which in turn is a successor to the Chaser and the Cresta, and the Mark II. Toyota's official Mark II Blit successor is the front-wheel drive minivan, the Mark X ZiO, from September 2007. The Mark II Blit marked the return to the Mark II platform with rear-wheel drive layout with optional four-wheel drive and not a wagon version of the front-wheel drive Camry. The car was given a minor facelift in December 2004, including changes to the headlamps, grille and taillamps, which are replaced with LED units. The Mark II Blit uses six-cylinder engines with an optional turbocharger that was discontinued in May 2006, as a result of Japan's emission standards in 2005. The engines used were the 2.0 L 1G-FE, 2.5 L 1JZ-FSE, 2.5 L 1JZ-GE, and 2.5 L single-turbocharged 1JZ-GTE.

The name "Blit" is taken from German word "blitz", meaning "lightning".

Trim levels 
The Mark II Blit was offered in several trim levels. It is identical to the Mark II sedan's trim levels, although the Mark II Blit wasn't offered in the Grande trim level:

Gallery

References 

Mark II Blit
Cars introduced in 2002
Mid-size cars
Station wagons
Rear-wheel-drive vehicles
All-wheel-drive vehicles